Novolin is the brand name of three distinct insulin-containing products manufactured by Novo Nordisk:
 	
 Novolin 70/30, an insulin preparation containing mixed NPH and regular insulin, respectively
 Novolin N, an insulin preparation containing NPH insulin	
 Novolin R, an insulin preparation containing regular insulin

See also 	
 Insulin (medication)

References

Insulin therapies